Kaduy is a rural locality (a village) in Semizerye Rural Settlement, Kaduysky District, Vologda Oblast, Russia. The population was 19 as of 2002.

Geography 
It is located 10 km northeast of Kaduy (a work settlement) (the district's administrative centre) by road. Zhornovets is the nearest rural locality.

References 

Rural localities in Kaduysky District